Balkhash is a city in Kazakhstan, located on the northern shore of the Lake Balkhash, on the Bay Bertys, and in south of Kazakh Uplands. Population of the city:  

Balkhash was founded in 1937 as an industrial city centred on the mining and smelting of copper, and presently copper is still exploited there. The city lies approximately 500 km west of the Chinese border on the north side of the lake at an altitude of 440 m.

The history of the city is closely connected with mining of deposits of copper and development of a smelting plant.

History

On 11 April 1937, a small worker's settlement "Pribalhashstroy", designed in connection with the construction of a copper factory - BGMC, was transformed into the city of Balkhash by decision of the Central Executive Committee of the Kazakh SSR. In this way, the copper factory affected the city's appearance.

On 9 November 1932, the first school was established in the city - school No. 1. The school educated a few children of the builders of the city that time. Among these children was Maria Nicolaevna Guseva (Halova). This school became a matter of her life: firstly she was one of the first pupils. Later, she became a teacher. In 1935, a section for parachuting was opened. Its first director was Dyusembayev.

During the Great Patriotic War (Russian term for World War II), most of the male population was conscripted into the military service and women replaced them in the copper factory.

After World War II, Japanese war prisoners took part in the building of the city. In particular, they built buildings, the "Palace of Metallurgists" and the local airport.

After the collapse of the Soviet Union, between 1992 and 1996, the city and its residents, like most former Soviet citizens, experienced an acute crisis, including power outages, weak central heating and intermittent operation of the copper factory. Some people cooked on fires in their yards; in winter they heated their apartments with potbelly stoves. Summer cottages served as an additional source of foodstuffs, contributing to the populace's survival. In the late 1990s, the city's and country's economies stabilised. A new neighborhood was built in the city, the so-called "Canadian cottages". All schools, medical facilities and the college started to function normally.

Administration and directorates
Due to the appointment of former Mayor Kadyrzhan Teylyanova as Chairman of the Committee of Fisheries of the Ministry of Agriculture of the Republic of Kazakhstan, Nurlan Erikbaevich Aubakirov (born 29.12.1975) has been the mayor of Balkash since 29 May 2012.

Balkhash's city government also administers the urban-type settlements of Sayak (3669 people), Gulshat and Chubar-Tubek (625 people). In May 1997, the city of Balkhash was transferred from Dzhezkazgan Region to Karaganda Region due to a boundary change.

Population
The combined population of the city and its urban area is 75,453 people (2010).  The ethnic composition on 1 January 2010 was:
 Kazakhs — 50,307 people (64,94 %)
 Russians — 19,823 people (26,20 %)
 Ukrainians — 1,169 people (1,94 %)
 Germans — 1,032 people (1,83 %)
 Koreans — 1,172 people (1,55 %)
 Tatars — 1,080 people (1,43 %)
 Belarusians — 229 people (0,37 %)
 Chechen people — 183 (0,24 %)
 Azerbaijani people — 119 (0,16 %)
 Uzbeks — 112 people (0,15 %)
 Others — 1,134 people (1,50 %)
 In total — 77,662 people (100,00 %)

In recent years, the number of Russian speakers is dramatically declining, but this is more than compensated by an influx of Kazakhs, who come mostly from rural areas, resulting in growth of the city's population after the substantial decline in the 1990s.

Climate

Balkhash has a cool semi-arid climate (Köppen climate classification BSk) bordering on a cool arid climate (BWk) with very warm summers and frigid winters. Precipitation is low throughout the year. Snow is common, though light, in winter.

Akim of Balkhash town 
Previously, this position was held by Alexander Agliulin. He voluntarily went to the post of akim of Balkhash town. "Erlan Koshanov presented the new head of the city. It was the Taurbekov Oraz. Prior to the appointment, he headed the Department of economy, " - said the press Secretary of the akim of the region Marina Shapovalova on Facebook.

Economy

Infrastructure

See also
Balkhash airport
Lake Balkhash
Balkhashtsvetmet

References

External links

All info of Balkhash
Info page of BBC about Balkhash town, with picture material

Cities and towns in Kazakhstan
Populated places in Karaganda Region
Cities and towns built in the Soviet Union
Populated places established in 1937
Lake Balkhash